Iain Douglas-Hamilton, D.Phil., CBE, is an authority on elephant behaviour and conservation. He attended Gordonstoun School, and later Oxford University where he earned a degree in Zoology and a D.Phil studying the Ecology and Behaviour of the African Elephant. His work in the 1960s paved the way for much of today’s understanding of elephants and current conservation practices. During the 1970s, he investigated the status of elephants throughout Africa and was the first to alert the world to the ivory poaching crisis. He chronicled the diminution of Africa’s elephant population by half between 1979 and 1989 and was instrumental in bringing about the world ivory trade ban. In 1993, Douglas-Hamilton founded Save the Elephants (STE) a charity dedicated specifically to elephants. Since that time, Save the Elephants has conducted research on elephant across Africa and has increased public awareness of the many dangers that threaten elephants and the habitats in which they live. Fundamental to his work at STE, Douglas-Hamilton pioneered GPS tracking of elephants in Africa, which has become a standard and widely emulated survey technique; it also guides the deployment of rangers to protect vulnerable and key elephant populations. Douglas-Hamilton and his wife, Oria, have co-authored two award-winning books, Among the Elephants (1975) and Battle for the Elephants (1992), and have made several television films. Dr. Iain Douglas-Hamilton was awarded the 2010 Indianapolis Prize, one of the world's leading awards for animal conservation. In 2013 The Elephant Crisis Fund (a joint initiative between Save the Elephants and San Francisco based NGO Wildlife Conservation Network) was established to confront the threat to elephants by supporting the most urgent, important and catalytic projects across the crisis to stop the killing, stop the trafficking and end the demand for ivory. In October 2014 he was presented with the George B Rabb Conservation Medal by the Chicago Zoological Society (CZS) for his authoritative work to benefit African elephants. In 2015 he was awarded the Commander of the British Empire and was presented the Lifetime Achievement Award by San Diego Zoological Society with most recently being awarded the Tanzanian Wildlife Research Institute’s (TAWIRI) Tanzania Wildlife Research Award for his lifelong devotion to elephants. Currently he is focused on winning hearts and minds to help reduce the demand for ivory, and focus on understanding elephant’s reasons for movements, and their deep history in time.

Family and education

Douglas-Hamilton is the son of Lord David Douglas-Hamilton, a World War II Royal Air Force officer and Spitfire pilot, and Ann Prunella Stack, a women's fitness pioneer, and he has an elder brother, Diarmaid. He was born in Dorset, UK, attended Gordonstoun School in Scotland between 1955 and 1960, and went on to study Zoology at Oxford University, earning first a bachelor's degree, in 1965, and then a D.Phil., in 1972.

He is married to Oria Douglas-Hamilton, founder of Elephant Watch Camp (a luxury tented camp with the highest eco-credentials, in Samburu National Reserve, Kenya), with whom he has two daughters: Saba, a documentary film-maker and television presenter, and Dudu, a documentary producer. He and his family live in Kenya.

Early life and work

Manyara

At the age of 23, Douglas-Hamilton moved to Tanzania to live in the wild in Lake Manyara National Park, where he carried out the first scientific study of the social interactions of the African elephant. From that study came his hypothesis, rooted in behavioural ecology, that elephant movements could hold the key to understanding their reactions to their changing environments. Douglas-Hamilton argues that collecting and analysing large amounts of data on elephant locations and migrations can lead to insights into their choices, and therefore assist in their protection against rising threats, including poaching and human-wildlife conflict. Douglas-Hamilton's work is described in the book Among the Elephants written together with his wife Oria, and by Peter Matthiessen in his book The Tree Where Man Was Born.

Counting elephants

Douglas-Hamilton initially developed techniques to monitor widespread elephant movements from the air. In the early 1970s, he designed study methods that would allow for comprehensive and replicable surveys of elephant families from low-flying aircraft, which would at the same time allow large population counts to be undertaken for the first time. Between 1976 and 1979, Douglas-Hamilton worked on a joint IUCN /WWF Elephant Survey and Conservation Programme, which surveyed African elephant populations in 34 countries to produce scientific data to help shape policy recommendations for the species' protection. Around the same time, working for IUCN, Douglas-Hamilton undertook research to map out the scale of the world ivory trade, its value, and its regulations. Meanwhile, he continued to direct aerial surveys of elephant populations into the 1980s, including in Uganda, Tanzania and the Central African Republic.

The 'elephant holocaust' and the international ivory trade ban

Douglas-Hamilton's aerial surveys, coupled with research coming from other studies, began to show for the first time the scale of the poaching crisis that was sweeping Africa during the 1970s and 1980s, as demand for ivory from Asia, in particular from Japan, grew. From 1980 to 1982, Douglas-Hamilton was made Honorary Chief Park Warden and anti-poaching advisor to Uganda's national parks authority. There, he designed air and ground patrols against poachers, many from Sudan, where civil war was raging and poached elephant ivory could be sold to raise money to buy weapons. On occasion, Douglas-Hamilton was shot at as he carried out his work.

His work in Uganda helped to stem the loss of elephants to poachers, and allowed him to propose ways that poachers could be stopped in other parts of Africa, using the methods he developed in Uganda. Douglas-Hamilton's estimates, drawn from his research and that of others, suggested that the population of African elephants across the continent of at least 1.3 million individuals in 1979 had been reduced to less than half, or around 600,000, by 1989. These statistics illustrated to the world the scale of what became known as the elephant holocaust. Regulation of the trade was attempted, via the Convention on the International Trade in Endangered Species, but eventually it was globally accepted that a ban should be enforced to stem the loss of illegally killed elephants. Douglas-Hamilton was among Africa's leading conservationists who argued for this position. It is widely accepted that the ban worked, and elephant populations, especially savannah populations, began to recover.

Save The Elephants 

The first 20 years of Douglas-Hamilton's work had illustrated that close scientific study of elephant populations, coupled with surveys of their ranges and movements, could help to mould policies that could protect them from external changes. To build on this work, in 1993 Douglas-Hamilton founded Save The Elephants, a charity registered in the UK and headquartered in Nairobi, with its main research station in Samburu National Reserve in northern Kenya. Its mission is "to secure a future for elephants" by preserving the environments in which the animals live and encouraging a tolerant relationship between elephant and human populations.

Collection of scientific data continues to drive Douglas-Hamilton's work with Save The Elephants, both with the aerial surveys that he pioneered early in his career, and increasingly with modern technology including tracking collared elephants by GPS and satellites. Save The Elephants has since its formation been studying herds resident or migratory to Samburu National Reserve, a cohort of roughly 500 individuals. Hundreds of elephants have been darted and fitted with collars carrying chips that communicate via satellites or mobile telephone networks with the charity's computer databases. From the initial collaring and monitoring of herds in Samburu, Douglas-Hamilton and Save The Elephants has gone on to use the same methods to study elephant populations in Mali, the Central African Republic and South Africa.

Alongside its focus on data collection, Douglas-Hamilton has directed Save The Elephants to increase its work on reducing the conflict between growing human populations and elephant herds.

The Elephants and Bees Project is part of Save the Elephants' Human-Elephant Coexistence program. The project is run by Dr. Lucy King, who completed her doctorate demonstrating elephants' instinctive fear of honey bees under the guidance and mentorship of Douglas-Hamilton. The project utilizes Beehive Fences, with beehives occupied by African bees, to reduce the problem of elephants destroying crops on small farms in Africa and Asia.

The poaching crisis

Douglas-Hamilton, and others, argue that 'one-off' sales of seized ivory stockpiled by the governments of South Africa, Zimbabwe, Namibia and Botswana to China and Japan in 2002 and 2008 kick-started a return of uncontrolled illegal poaching of Africa's elephants that is "far graver" even than during the 1970s and 1980s. Douglas-Hamilton and others estimate that between 2010 and 2012, more than 100,000 African elephants were illegally killed, and there is little sign since that the rate has reduced. The increased price of ivory is to blame. Since 2007, the price paid for elephant tusks has doubled in the area around Samburu National Reserve, Douglas-Hamilton testified in 2012 to the Committee on Foreign Relations at the US Senate as part of high-level investigations into the links between resurgent ivory poaching in Africa and insecurity. The price of ivory in markets in China, especially, and Asia generally, has also increased, driven by demand from growing middle classes keen to display their wealth, and speculators hoarding ivory against expected price rises following a new trade ban, or the extinction of the African elephant.

Douglas-Hamilton, echoing colleagues in the field, highlighted to the US Senate committee that current poaching trends could only be stemmed with increased anti-poaching efforts in African range states, better enforcement of laws against poaching, smuggling and money-laundering, and campaigns to reduce the demand for ivory products in Asia. Douglas-Hamilton and Save The Elephants worked with WildAid, an American charity dedicated to reducing the demand for products from endangered animals, to host Yao Ming, one of China's best-known sports personalities, during a fact-finding tour of Kenya in 2012. His campaign and others in China have helped to reduce the demand for ivory products, surveys showed.

Douglas-Hamilton says he remains "an optimist" that this second spike in poaching can be contained: "I've been through all of this before in the 70s and 80s. As a collective group we stopped that killing, and in the savannahs there was a reprieve of 20 years. I believe we can do it again,” he has said.

Awards, works and publications

Douglas-Hamilton is the recipient of many awards for his research and his work to protect Africa's elephants, including the 2010 Indianapolis Lilly Award, a major global award for animal conservation, for which he had previously been a finalist in 2006 and 2008. He also received the George B Rabb Conservation Medal of the Chicago Zoological Society in 2014, the Disney Wildlife Conservation Fund Award in 2006, the Dawkins Prize for Conservation and Animal Welfare in 2001, and others for his writing work prior to that.

Douglas-Hamilton is a member of the Technical Advisory Group to CITES for monitoring the illegal killing of elephants (MIKE) in Africa, a trustee of the Kenya Elephant Research Fund, a member since 1982 of the IUCN African Elephant Specialist Group, and currently a member of its African Elephant Data Review Working Group, and from 1993 to 2004 he was a wildlife and environmental consultant to the European Union and the US Fish and Wildlife Service.

Douglas-Hamilton has published many academic research papers throughout his career. He is the author, with his wife Oria, of Battle for the Elephants (Viking, 1992) and Among The Elephants (Doubleday, 1975), and has worked with documentary filmmakers as a technical advisor and expert.

References

External links
 "Iain Douglas-Hamilton", Elephant facts and information database
 "Dr. Iain Douglas Hamilton Biography", Walt Disney World Public Affairs
 Save the Elephants

English zoologists
1942 births
Living people
Iain Douglas-Hamilton
Commanders of the Order of the British Empire
Alumni of Oriel College, Oxford
People educated at Gordonstoun
British people of Irish descent
British people of Scottish descent
Writers about Africa
20th-century British writers
20th-century British zoologists
Elephant conservation